Pipar Road Junction railway station is a railway station in Jodhpur district, Rajasthan. Its code is PPR. It serves Piparcity. The station consists of 3 platforms. Passenger, Express and Superfast trains halt here.

References

Railway stations in Jodhpur district
Jodhpur railway division